Matúš Kozáčik (born 27 December 1983) is a Slovak retired football goalkeeper who last played for Czech club Viktoria Plzeň, and who now serves as a goalkeeping coach with the club's first team.

Club career
While Kozáčik was playing for Slavia Prague, Leeds United took him on trial in December 2006.

Anorthosis Famagusta

2010–2011 season
In June 2010 he agreed a two-year contract with the Cypriot side Anorthosis Famagusta until the summer of 2012. He took the Number 1 shirt from the previous Anorthosis goalkeeper Arjan Beqaj. Kozáčik made his debut for Anorthosis Famagusta in the First qualifying round of the 2010–11 UEFA Europa League against Banants. He kept two clean sheets.

Kozáčik lost his place into the starting eleven to the second goalkeeper of the team Marcos Argüello a 0–2 loss against Šibenik at Antonis Papadopoulos Stadium. After the January transfer period Argüello moved to Club Bolivar and Kozáčik returned to the starting line-up for the rest of the season.

2011–2012 season
Kozáčik started as first-choice goalkeeper for the club's European matches. Then, Kozáčik lost his position to other club goalkeeper Dimitar Ivankov for the next two matches. After two matches Ivankov left the club and from this point Kozáčik continued as first-choice goalkeeper.

FC Viktoria Plzeň
In June 2012, Kozáčik signed a three-year deal with Viktoria Plzeň. He quickly established himself as the starting goalkeeper for the club, with which he won the Czech league title in the 2012–2013 season. In February 2014, Kozáčik extended his contract with Plzeň until June 2017.

International career
On 10 December 2006, Kozáčik made his debut for Slovakia when he played in the first half of a friendly against the United Arab Emirates. However, his next game for the national team came almost seven years later when he started in a 2014 World Cup qualifier against Latvia.

Kozáčik had been Slovakia's number one goalkeeper in the successful qualification campaign for UEFA Euro 2016 qualifying and was the first choice of coach Ján Kozák. He continued to be preferred in the first half of 2018 FIFA World Cup qualification, however an injury excluded him from the remainder of the group matches. He only returned on 14 November 2017 to a friendly match against Norway. Since the injury, Kozáčik was only second-choice goalkeeper behind Martin Dúbravka, making sporadic appearances only.

For example, Kozáčik played 90 minutes of a controversial friendly against Denmark, who arrived with a squad of lower division players and futsal internationals, maintaining a clean sheet in the 3–0 win. After that, he appeared over almost a year later, in a friendly against Jordan (5-1 win). In this match, Kozáčik conceded a goal from Musa Al-Taamari after his solo run. In the second half, Kozáčik was replaced by international debutant Dominik Greif.

Managerial career
Since professional retirement in 2019, Kozáčik served in Viktoria Plzeň on various positions. By 2020 he became club's first team's goalkeeping coach. In September 2022, he took on the role of goalkeeping coach with the Slovak national team under first non-Czech nor Slovak coach for the team Francesco Calzona. He also became the sole Slovak in a coaching position with the team. In March 2023, it was announced that Kozáčik will be replaced by his former national team co-goalkeeper and KFC Komárno goalkeeping coach Ján Novota, with Novota already filling-in during the extraordinary December 2022 camp.

Honours

Club

Sparta Prague
 Czech First League:
 Champion: 2009–10
 Czech Cup :
 Champion: 2007-08

Slavia Prague
 Czech First League:
 Runner-up: 2002-03, 2004-05, 2006-07

Viktoria Plzeň
 Czech First League:
 Champion (4): 2012–13,  2014–15, 2015–16, 2017–18

Career statistics
As of 1 June 2018

References

External links 
 Statistics on SK Slavia Praha website 
 
 
 

1983 births
Living people
Slovak footballers
Slovak expatriate footballers
FC VSS Košice players
Czech First League players
SK Slavia Prague players
AC Sparta Prague players
FC Viktoria Plzeň players
Anorthosis Famagusta F.C. players
Slovak Super Liga players
Cypriot First Division players
Association football goalkeepers
People from Dolný Kubín
Sportspeople from the Žilina Region
Expatriate footballers in the Czech Republic
Expatriate footballers in Cyprus
Slovakia international footballers
UEFA Euro 2016 players
Slovak expatriate sportspeople in the Czech Republic